The Fitzgerald Family Christmas is a 2012 comedy-drama film starring Edward Burns and Connie Britton and written, directed, and produced by Burns. It premiered at the 2012 Toronto International Film Festival. It received positive reviews from critics, with a  rating on Rotten Tomatoes.

Premise
The seven adult siblings of the Fitzgerald family prepare for their estranged father to return home for Christmas for the first time since he walked out on his family 20 years ago.

Cast
 Edward Burns as Gerry
 Connie Britton as Nora
 Heather Burns as Erin
 Kerry Bishé as Sharon
 Marsha Dietlein as Dottie
 Caitlin FitzGerald as Connie
 Anita Gillette as Rosie
 Tom Guiry as Cyril
 Ed Lauter as Big Jim
 Michael McGlone as Quinn
 Noah Emmerich as Francis "FX" Xavier

See also
 List of Christmas films

References

External links
 

2012 films
2010s Christmas comedy-drama films
American Christmas comedy-drama films
Films directed by Edward Burns
Films set in New York (state)
2010s English-language films
2010s American films